Marine mammal training is the training of and caring for marine life such as, dolphins, orcas, sea lions, walruses, and other marine mammals.

Methodology
The trainers use a method called operant conditioning. Two types of reinforcers are used to train an animal to do the desired behavior. A primary reinforcer is an unlearned or unconditioned reward such as food. A secondary reinforcer is a learned or conditioned reward that acquires reinforcing value through its association with a primary reinforcer. Examples of a secondary reinforcer for the animal could be receiving rubs from a trainer or playing with an enrichment device like a basketball. Trainers need to make sure they reinforce the animal immediately after they have successfully done the behavior. If the reinforcer is not given immediately, the animal will not know that it did the correct behavior. In order to achieve this, the trainer needs to create a bridging stimulus, which is a signal that tells the animal that they have done the correct behavior at the moment they respond to the stimulus. This signal from the trainer could be a whistling sound, a click from a training clicker, or even a point of a finger toward the animal. The bridging stimulus acts as a bridge between the moment of the desired behavior and the moment the animal receives the reward. This helps the animal to receive immediate feedback which leads to faster learning and the maintaining of focus when a trainer works with an animal across physical space or an interval of time that causes immediate reinforcement to be impossible. When training a new behavior, it is important to teach in small steps. By training in small steps, you can train an animal to do complex behaviors. This step-by-step learning experience is called shaping. Trainers create different signals for the animals for different behaviors. This helps let the animal know the correct behavior to perform. If an animal does not respond to a signal or responds with an undesired behavior, then the trainer normally will remain motionless and wait three seconds before trying the signal again. This three-second pause is referred to as the Least Reinforcing Stimulus or LRS. It is like a short "time-out" for the animals. The trainers try not to force a situation and never punish an animal for not doing a behavior correctly.

History of Marine Training
Applied animal training employs many of the behavioral training techniques described by B.F. Skinner developed an experimental analysis of behavior through the use of rats and pigeons in operant chambers. During Skinner’s pigeon project, he and some graduate students including Marian and Keller Breland, trained pigeons to use a screen and steer a missile to a target. However, this project was never operational. After this project, the Brelands and Skinner were interested in potential applications of behavioral technology and operant principles. In 1944, the Breland’s opened a business called Animal Behavior Enterprises (ABE) on a farm they purchased. They used operant conditioning techniques to train a variety of animals for commercials, advertisements, and entertainment purposes. In 1950, the Breland’s opened a tourist attraction in Hot Springs, Arkansas called the I. Q. Zoo in Arkansas. The “Zoo” featured exhibits where trained animals would demonstrate many different behaviors, from dropping small basketballs into a hoop, or hitting a small baseball bat on a miniature field to hit a home run, and much more. In 1951, the Breland’s wrote an article called “A Field of Applied Animal Psychology” where they proposed that modern behavioral science and professional animal training are brought together through applied animal psychology. In the late 1950s into the early 1960’s, the Breland’s promoted and patented Master Mind, which was a dog training program and clicker training, before creating it in an early version.

In the 1950s and 1960s, the Breland’s and ABE adapted operant methods in order to use with marine mammals and began a training program at Marine Studios. The training program included training and developing new behaviors, providing written training manuals, instructing staff in operant methods, and designing props. When working with a dolphin named Splash, the Brelands were able to precisely shape and control behavior through using the bridging stimulus. In 1955, the Brelands wrote the first operant training manual for dolphins. It included general principles such as stimulus, bridging, shaping, differentiation, extinction, props, and schedules of reinforcement. It also included individual act instructions such as descriptions of act goals, target behaviors, signaling instructions, specific training directions, and educational as well as publicity considerations. ABE started the use of training logs to systematize and standardize training and to track the animal’s progress. In addition, the Brelands wrote the first manuals on training whales and dolphins. They scripted and created shows and taught others how to train using operant technology. Other marine parks that use operant training can be traced back to the ABE and the spread of behavioral technology, which helped the marine animal training industry to grow rapidly.

The world’s first oceanarium called Marine Studios was located in St. Augustine, Florida, and opened on June 23, 1938. This park was originally designed as an underwater movie studio, educational facility, and marine research center, but it became a popular tourist attraction. Park visitors could watch marine animals from an observation deck or through the clear walls of the saltwater pools. Atlantic bottlenose dolphins were featured in the first major dolphin attraction called the Top Deck Show. Personnel used a form of shaping by requiring varying and increasingly higher jumps. Personnel would hold fish over the water and the dolphins would leap into the air and take fish out of their hands or their mouth.

Marine Studios hired a former sea lion trainer from the Ringling Brothers and Barnum & Bailey Circus named Adolf Frohn to train the dolphins to, on command, play with inner tubes. Frohn had no previous experience working with dolphins. He worked with a two-year-old male dolphin named Flippy beginning in September 1949. Frohn first worked with Flippy to get him to remain in his presence and accept fish from him. The trainer did so by rowing a small boat around the lagoon to stay near Flippy. Flippy learned six tricks which included honking a bulb horn, ringing a bell, raising a flag, retrieving and catching a ball, pulling a surfboard ridden by a woman or dog, and jumping through a hoop. Marine Studios announced the world’s first trained dolphin to the public in February of 1951. Frohn kept his training methods secretive by not keeping training records, not writing method instructions, and not allowing assistants to participate in training due to the circus training tradition of passing down the craft through apprenticeship. He used positive reinforcement and believed in the importance of a trusting, patient, and affectionate relationship between a trainer and animal.

The rising popularity of marine mammal attractions led to the creation of additional parks such as Sea Life Park Hawaii and SeaWorld. Sea Life Park was opened in 1963 and founded by Pryor and her first husband. Pryor used Ronald Turner’s operant training manual for dolphins and was able to train dolphins and teach training staff about operant conditioning. These methods were applied to training spinner, Kiko, and pacific bottlenose dolphins. Pryor’s writings about her experiences played a major role in the spread of the use of operant psychology in animal training. SeaWorld was founded by George Millay, Ken Norris, and other investors. In 1964, Millay hired Kent Burgess to be SeaWorld’s Director of Animal Training who was from ABE. Burgess used his experience from Marineland of the Pacific and Marine Studios to apply behavioral training in a structured system that included using behavioral record-keeping, manuals, and courses that train in behavioral psychology. Burgess used operant psychology to train a Killer whale named Shamu. After two months of training, Shamu performed in shows for the public on a regular basis. This show included behaviors like opening her mouth to have her teeth brushed and examined, showing her fluke reflexes, having her heart checked, kissing her doctor on the cheek, and jumping to a target 15 feet in the air. The training program that Burgess implemented was valid, reliable, and efficient in all animal acts. The animal’s behavior was the focus at SeaWorld through the use of operant psychology instead of on the trainer’s skill.

How to Become a Marine Mammal Trainer
There are five steps needed to become a marine mammal trainer: earn a high school diploma, volunteer at a marine mammal facility, earn a college degree, obtain an internship, and become SCUBA certified. Most marine mammal trainers earn their degree in marine biology, psychology, and/or animal behavior. Even though formal education is very important, it is even more important to get hands-on experience with an experienced trainer to learn and become familiar with marine mammal behaviors.

Marine Mammal trainer Job Description and Salary
Training marine life is a very big task and takes a lot of responsibility. Many people have an unrealistic view of what training these mammals involve. A trainer’s duties include an enormous amount of cleaning, preparing food, feeding, training, writing records, performing in shows, public education, and public interaction. A study done by dolphins.org states, that the average salary for an entry-level trainer is between $18,000-$20,000. This ranges from facility to facility but this is the average. Since marine mammal trainers tend to be secure in their position and close to the animals they work with, the job turnover rate is low. Once people secure a job in this field, they tend to stay for life.

Marine Mammal Facilities
California, Florida, and New York are the three highest states with available animal trainer job positions. Since there are few marine parks and aquariums that open each year, the demand for marine mammal trainers is very competitive. Marine mammal trainers can work in aquariums, zoos, non-profit environmental advocacy organizations, eco-tourism companies, university research laboratories, industrial research centers, private companies, and government research laboratories or marine stations.

Schooling for Marine Mammal Training
Here are some great schools for marine mammal training: University of Alaska Fairbanks, University of California Santa Cruz, California State University, Cornell University, University of Delaware, Duke University, University of Hawaii at Manoa, University of Maine, and many more. Most of these schools provide an extensive schooling program with field experiences integrated with classroom and laboratory courses. While a bachelor's degree is not mandatory for this career, it is more beneficial to have at least a 4-year degree. If a bachelor's degree is not acquired, then all of the certifications, volunteering, and qualifications are still needed to become a marine mammal trainer. Dolphin Research Center Training Institute, established in 2012 as the College for Marine Mammal Professions, DRCTI offers an accelerated Occupational associate degree in Marine Mammal Behavior, Care and Training that can be attained in 36 weeks.

International Marine Animal Trainers' Association
The International Marine Animal Trainers' Association (known as IMATA), was created in 1972. IMATA was created for communication, professionalism, and cooperation between those who serve marine life. This helps network and exchange ideas between marine animal trainers internationally. IMATA is dedicated to providing and advancing the most professional, effective, and humane care of marine animals in all habitats. IMATA's responsibilities are for striving to continue the existence of oceanaria, aquaria, and laboratories housing marine animals. There are four rules for the Code of Professional Ethics. Each member is committed to:

 Exercising the highest levels of respect and humaneness for all animals.
 Exercising professional integrity in representing ourselves as members of the marine animal community, as representatives of the facilities we serve, or as members of this Association.
 Fostering respect, understanding, and cooperation among fellow members and others associated with the zoological community in general and the marine animal community in particular.
 Contributing to the promotion of public and professional interest in IMATA and accepting the obligations of membership as required to the best of our abilities.

References

Animal training
Animal trainers
Marine mammals